Three D Radio (call sign: 5DDD) is a community radio station based in Adelaide, Australia and located in St Peters, South Australia. Established in 1979, it broadcasts on 93.7 MHz across the greater metropolitan area of Adelaide and the surrounding rural areas, as well as a live stream via its website. Three D Radio is run by volunteers, with no paid staff and is funded by contributions made by its listeners and the very occasional grant.

History 
Regular broadcasting began at midnight, 21 December 1979, on a frequency of 103.3 MHz. The first music heard on Triple M (as the station was then known) was a version of Tomorrow Never Knows by 801 Live, then Turn Up Your Radio by the Masters Apprentices. The first voice to be heard was that of Mandy Salomon whose brief introduction conveyed the incredulous excitement of the 500-strong crowd of supporters celebrating outside the studios. The on-air launch by Premier Don Dunstan followed. The Triple M callsign was purchased in the early 1990s by Village Roadshow, for their national network of stations under that name. Although the terms of the deal were not disclosed, the major cash injection allowed the station to purchase modern equipment and maintain running costs for quite some time.  The station changed name to Three D Radio on 1 October 1993.

Format 
There are over 60 diverse programs going to air each week to an average cumulative audience of over 110,000 listeners.

Three D Radio is run by the PMBA, or Progressive Music Broadcasting Association. They are committed to playing contemporary, progressive and alternative music and support the local music and arts community in a way that few other Adelaide radio stations do.  One way is via the Sound Lounge program where local bands play live to air from the Three D studios.

There are no playlists. Announcers are free to choose the music that they present; however, there are strict quotas which ensure that content is at least 40% Australian music, of which half is local South Australian releases and a quarter is local unsigned material. Another quarter of music content is from female artists, who historically have been under-represented in broadcast music.

Shows 
Monday
 First Thing Monday
 Simple Sounds
 Reverb
 Front Ears
 Instromania!
 Afterthought
 Kpopalypse
 Mike Drive
 Voiceprint Arts
 Hillbilly Hoot
  Twilight Jamboree / Illogical Progression

Tuesday
 Mellowscream
 Four Larks & A Wren
 The Droste Effect
 Three D Lounge
 Technicolour Dreaming
 Flow Motion
 The Mysterioso Show
 The Whole Kit & Caboodle
 Steppin' Out
 The Environment Show
 Proud To Be Loud
 The Vanishing Point

Wednesday
 PS I Love You
 Before I Wake
 Spacejam Radio
 Euphoric Amnesia
 Groovin' With Sister T
 Rise Above
 Sonic Cinematic
 Audio Origami
 Mystery Train
 Offbeat
 Raw Like Sushi
 Hush & Pandemonium

Thursday
 The Sound Of Muesli
 Freewheelin'
 Smash It Up
 Southbound
 Cuckoo's Nest
 Youth FM
 Follow The Sound
 Mystery Train
 Blues Power
 Roots & Branches

Friday
 Friday Breakfast
 Strange Rampage
 Spin Out
 Street Beat
 The Doo Wop Corner
 Drivel Drive
 Local & Live
 Best Kept Secret
 Jukebox Jungle
 Critical Mess

Saturday
 4 Course Breakfast
 Yodel Action
 Revival
 The B-Side / The Grand Intro
 Oscillate Wildly
 Top 20+1
 The Sound Lounge
 Voodoo Vinyl

Sunday
 Desolation Sounds
 Sunday Sleep In
 Snooze Button
 Seriously Straight Totally Twisted
 Lawnmower Music
 Set The Controls / Underground Frequency
 The Prison Show
 POWERSURGE
 A New Dave Rising

See also 
 List of radio stations in Australia

References

External links 
Three D Radio

Community radio stations in Australia
Radio stations in Adelaide